Söderfjärden is a polder in Ostrobothnia, western Finland, 10 kilometres south of the town of Vaasa. The plain is in an impact crater which was made at least some 640 million years old (Proterozoic, near the end of the Cryogenian). The crater's diameter is 6.6 km and its maximum depth is 300 metres. It is filled with Cambrian sandstones leaving only the outer rim visible. There is also a central uplift, which is buried. After rising from the sea due to post-glacial rebound, Söderfjärden was a wetland but was later drained with help of a pump station. It is currently cultivated and is clearly visible from air as a large circular field. This makes Söderfjärden unique among the other impact structures in Finland which are at least partially below sea level. The area of the basin is divided half and half between Vaasa and Korsholm, with a small corner belonging to Malax.

See also
Impact craters in Finland

References

External links 
 Sundom village travel information page about Söderfjärden.
 Söderfjärden in Finnish impact structures homepage.
 The homepage of a local exhibition site, called Meteoria, in Swedish, Meteoriihi in Finnish, describing the area. Ria (riihi) is a kind of barn, where crop is dried, and the building looks like one.
Google Earth view

Impact craters of Finland
Proterozoic impact craters
Landforms of Ostrobothnia (region)
Polders